Hungu were a political faction of the Joseon Dynasty in the 15th and 16th centuries. It was created in 1455 by Sejo of Joseon. After the death of Sejo and ascension of Seongjong of Joseon, the rival Sarim gained power and influence. The Hungu retaliated under the reign of Yeonsangun in two violent purges of Sarim members. After Yeonsangun's overthrow by pro-Sarim Jungjong and his minister Jo Gwang-jo, Hungu engineered a third purge that resulted in Jo's death. Hungu wielded power through the rest of Jungjong's reign and into the reign of Myeongjong of Joseon. In 1567, with the ascension of Seonjo of Joseon to the throne, the influence of Hungu permanently ended in favor of Sarim.

Members
Shin Suk-ju

Events
Yeonsangun of Joseon: First Literati Purge of 1498 and Second Literati Purge of 1504
Jungjong of Joseon: coup of 1506, Third Literati Purge of 1519

Joseon dynasty
Political history of Korea